Laurier L. LaPierre  (November 21, 1929 – December 16, 2012) was a Canadian Senator, professor, broadcaster, journalist and author. He was a member of the Liberal Party of Canada.

Fluently bilingual, LaPierre was best known for having been co-host with Patrick Watson of the CBC's influential public affairs show This Hour Has Seven Days in the 1960s. After the show's much publicized cancellation, LaPierre moved to politics as a "star candidate" for the New Democratic Party in the 1968 federal election. The party was hoping that he would help achieve an electoral breakthrough in Quebec, but he came second in the riding of Lachine with 19.5% of the vote.

He returned to teaching, broadcasting and writing until his appointment to the Senate in June 2001. As a member of the Liberal caucus, LaPierre was an outspoken supporter of Jean Chrétien against supporters of rival Paul Martin.

Early life and education 
LaPierre was born in Lac-Mégantic, Quebec, after which his family moved to Sherbrooke, Quebec, where he completed high school before entering the Paulist Fathers in Baltimore, Maryland, as a novitiate. After four years, he moved to St. Michael's College at the University of Toronto. He received a Bachelor of Arts (1955) from the University of Toronto (St. Michael's College), Master of Arts (1957) and Ph.D. in History (1962) from the University of Toronto.

During those university years he was a part-time teacher at Upper Canada College in Toronto.

He taught History at the College of Christ the King (now King's College), University of Western Ontario (1959–61); Loyola College, Montreal (now part of Concordia University) (1961–63); and McGill University (1963–78). In 1978, he moved to Vancouver to work in television but also taught briefly at Simon Fraser University.

In 1960, he married Paula (Jo) Armstrong and they had two sons: Dominic born 1962 and Thomas born 1965. They were divorced in 1982. He had five grandchildren - Paige, Alex, Georgia, Toby and Owen LaPierre.

He moved to Ottawa in 1990, continued to work in broadcasting and writing, and lived there until his death, in the later years, with his partner Harvey Slack.

He wrote several popular histories including Quebec: A Tale of Love; Sir Wilfrid Laurier and the Romance of Canada; 1759: The Battle for Canada; Québec hier et aujourd'hui; and, The Apprenticeship of Canada, 1876–1914. He also wrote articles for The Financial Post, International Review, Canadian Forum and Encyclopædia Britannica.

He was an activist with EGALE, a lobby group for gay and lesbian rights, after coming out as gay in the late 1980s. He was Canada's first openly gay senator.

Death 
Appointed an Officer of the Order of Canada in 1994, he was cited as one of Canada's "most valuable political commentators and respected champions of social justice." He died on December 16, 2012, aged 83. LaPierre's ashes were scattered off the coast of British Columbia, as his will requested. Later Harvey Slack financed the construction of a large memorial in LaPierre's name in the small MacLaren Cemetery near Wakefield, Quebec, close to the grave of his ex-wife's uncle Hume Wrong and that of Lester B. Pearson. The McGill University Archives holds an extensive collection of his papers, including documents that touch on four aspects of his career: academic, journalistic, political and entrepreneurial.

Footnotes

External links
 

1929 births
2012 deaths
Academics in Quebec
20th-century Canadian historians
Canadian male non-fiction writers
Canadian senators from Ontario
Canadian television hosts
CBC Television people
Canadian non-fiction writers in French
Gay politicians
Canadian gay writers
LGBT historians
Canadian LGBT senators
Canadian LGBT rights activists
Liberal Party of Canada senators
Officers of the Order of Canada
People from Lac-Mégantic, Quebec
Historians from Quebec
University of Toronto alumni
Writers from Quebec
Canadian LGBT journalists
Canadian LGBT broadcasters
21st-century Canadian politicians
Canadian Screen Award winning journalists
21st-century Canadian LGBT people
20th-century Canadian LGBT people